The 6th Hum Awards by Hum Network Limited, honored the best in fashion, music, and Hum Television Dramas of 2017. It took place on July 28, 2018, at the FirstOntario Centre in Bay Street, Hamilton, Ontario at 8:00 p.m. Eastern Time Zone. Hum Awards were given in 25 categories. The ceremony was televised in Pakistan by Hum TV.

Winners and nominees
On June 26, 2018, the nominees for the five viewers' choice categories were announced through the Hum Network website, which was followed by a period of public voting.

Winners are listed first, highlighted in boldface.

Television

Dramas with multiple awards 

The following five dramas received multiple awards:

References

External links
 

2018 television awards
2018 music awards
Hum Awards
Hum Award winners
Hum Awards ceremonies
Events in Toronto